The Sichuan jay (Perisoreus internigrans) is a species of bird in the family Corvidae. It is endemic to China.

Taxonomy
It is one of three members of the genus Perisoreus, the others being the Siberian jay, P. infaustus, found from Norway to eastern Russia, and the Canada jay, P. canadensis, restricted to the boreal forest and western montane regions of North America. All three species store food and live year-round on permanent territories in coniferous forests.

Distribution and habitat
Its natural habitat is subtropical or tropical moist montane forests. It is threatened by habitat loss.

Conservation
They are mostly situated in isolated fragments of highly elevated coniferous forests on the Qinghai-Tibet plateau of west-central China. These locations are generally isolated, because of the mountainous terrain of the region. However, it is predicted that both of the extent of suitable habitat and the suitability of that habitat will decrease substantially under climate change. Climate change might force these birds to migrate northward and upward, where areas remaining for such compensatory extension are quite restricted. In addition, acceptable habitat will become much more disconnected, which may increase the negative effects of climate change indirectly by slowing or halting gene flow and accelerating the rate of extinction of fragmented local populations.

References

External links
BirdLife Species Factsheet.

Sichuan jay
Birds of Central China
Endemic birds of China
Sichuan jay
Sichuan jay
Taxonomy articles created by Polbot